The men's shot put at the 2017 World Championships in Athletics was held at the Olympic Stadium on .

Summary
2016 Olympic champion, #7 all-time and the 2017 season leader Ryan Crouser was the favourite, having won every single meet of the season leading up to the Championships. Nine athletes reached the automatic qualification mark of 20.75m in the qualification round. The defending world champion Joe Kovacs and the European U23 champion Konrad Bukowiecki qualified for the final as non-automatic qualifiers.

In the final Joe Kovacs led after the first round with a put of 21.48 metres, and in the second round he was overtaken by Tomas Walsh with 21.64 metres while Stipe Žunić moved into third with 21.46 metres. The order of the top three never subsequently changed, although Walsh and Kovacs both improved their distances in the third round. In the final round Kovacs put beyond the 22 metre line, but this was a foul throw. Already the winner, Walsh finished with his best put of 22.03 metres.

Records
Before the competition records were as follows:

No records were set at the competition.

Qualification standard
The standard to qualify automatically for entry was 20.50 metres.

Schedule
The event schedule, in local time (UTC+1), was as follows:

Results

Qualification
The qualification round took on 5 August, in two groups, with Group A starting at 10:00 and Group B starting at 10:01. Athletes attaining a mark of at least 20.75 metres ( Q ) or at least the 12 best performers ( q ) qualified for the final. The overall results were as follows:

Final
The final took place on 6 August at 20:35. The results were as follows:

References

Shot put
Shot put at the World Athletics Championships